Quincy Rose Davis (born May 18, 1995) is a surfer born in Montauk, New York.

Early years
Davis was born in Montauk, New York. She started surfing when she was seven years old.(Some of her relatives are the Guido's, D'Onofrio's, Schaefer's, and Franza's)  With the shore as her backyard, Davis spent long summer days at the beach with her family who were always surfing.  After becoming bored of swimming and running around she decided to give surfing a try.

Davis started attending local surf events with older friends and would sometimes compete herself, but always against the boys because there weren't any other girls in her age division.  Her amateur career started when she came home with trophies and her mother decided to enter her into more events.  Davis credits her family and friends for her constant surfing inspiration and support.  Her family has a home in Rincon, Puerto Rico where they spend their winters.

Davis has passions outside of the surf world that include music, Christmas movies and fashion.  In 2013, Davis collaborated with her sponsor Volcom, inspiring and designing a clothing collection for Spring and Fall.

Davis currently curates clothing and accessories for her “seasoned outpost” Quincy x MTK located in Montauk, New York. The outpost is tucked away in a little alley, between her family's business, Happy Bowls, and a local Mexican restaurant. The surfer took her passions and turned them into products that resemble “her fun in the sun lifestyle.”

Career Highlights
2009: 1st NSSA Championships, Open Women
2009: 1st, Volcom Qualifying Series (Girls) – Long Beach, N.Y.
2010: 1st Corona Extra Pro Surf Circuit –Puerto Rico
2012: 1st, Corona Extra Pro Surf Circuit – Puerto Rico
2012: 3rd, Oakley World Pro Junior – Bali, Indonesia
2013: 3rd, U.S. Open, Pro Junior
2015: 1st, Corona Extra Pro Surf Circuit - Puerto Rico

References

Living people
1995 births
American surfers
American female surfers
Sportspeople from Suffolk County, New York
People from Montauk, New York
21st-century American women